Wild Thing or Wild Things can refer to:

Books and comics
 Wild Thing (comics), a 1999 Marvel Comics superheroine in the MC2 alternate future
 The Wild Things, a 2009 novel written by Dave Eggers

Film and television
 Wild Thing (film), a 1987 film directed by Max Reid
 "Wild Thing", a 1990 live-action Super Mario Bros. Super Show! episode
 Wild Things (film series), as of 1998
 Wild Things (film), a 1998 film starring Matt Dillon, Kevin Bacon, Denise Richards, and Neve Campbell
 Wild Things 2, a 2004 sequel to the above film
 Wild Things: Diamonds in the Rough, a 2005 film in the Wild Things series
 Wild Things: Foursome, a 2010 film in the Wild Things series
 Wild Things (TV series), a 2010 reality television series
 Wild Things with Dominic Monaghan, a 2012 wildlife documentary series
 Wild Things (game show), a 2015 game show
 Ricky "Wild Thing" Vaughn, a fictional baseball pitcher in Major League and Major league II

Music
 Wild Things!, a 1966 album by the Ventures
 "Wild Thing" (The Troggs song), a 1966 song written by Chip Taylor
 Wild Things (EP), a 1981 EP by The Creatures
 "Wild Thing", a 1986 song by Sister Carol appearing in the film Something Wild
 "Wild Thing" (Tone Lōc song), a 1989 song by rapper Tone Lōc
 "Wild Thing", a 2011 song by Noah & The Whale
 "Wild Things" (song), a 2016 song by Canadian singer Alessia Cara
 Wild Things (album), a 2016 album by Ladyhawke

Sport and leisure
 Wild Thing (roller coaster), a Steel Hyper roller coaster at Valleyfair in Shakopee, Minnesota
 Washington Wild Things, a minor-league baseball team
 ULBI Wild Thing, German ultralight aircraft
 Wild Thing (yacht), a maxi yacht built in 2003

Sports people
 Mitch Williams (born 1964), American baseball pitcher nicknamed "Wild Thing"
 Anderson Varejão (born 1982), Brazilian basketball player nicknamed "Wild Thing"
 Shaun Tait (born 1983), Australian cricketer dubbed "The Wild Thing"
 Kyle Busch (born 1985), American stock car racing driver nicknamed "Wild Thing"
 Steven May, retired American professional wrestler who competed as of 1987 as "Wild Thing" Steve Ray in the UWF

Other
 Wild Things (organization), a network of people engaged with nature in the Chicago area
 Wild Thing (podcast)

See also
 Where the Wild Things Are (disambiguation)